Dalek I Love You was the eponymous 1983 album from Dalek I Love You.
On 2 April 2007, it was made available for the first time on CD.

Track listing
All songs were written by Dalek I Love You, except where noted.

LP
Korova KODE 7 (UK), 24-0258-1 (Europe)

Side One
 "Holiday in Disneyland" (Dalek I Love You, Keith Hartley) – 4:40
 "Horrorscope" – 4:03
 "Health and Happiness" (Dalek I Love You, K. Hartley) – 3:14
 "The Mouse That Roared" (Dalek I Love You, K. Hartley) – 2:49
 "Dad on Fire" – 3:39
 "Ambition" – 3:43
Side Two
  "Lust" (Dalek I Love You, K. Hartley) – 4:22
 "12 Hours of Blues" – 5:32
 "Sons of Sahara" – 5:27
 "Africa Express" – 7:14

CD Bonus Tracks
(2007 UK Korova KODE 1016)
11. "Would You Still Love Me" (Dalek I Love You, K. Hartley) – 4:22
12. "These Walls We Build" (Dalek I Love You, K. Hartley) – 5:05
13. "Horrorscope" (Instrumental Version) – 6:04
14. "Masks & Licences" – 3:05
15. "The Angel and The Clown" – 3:40
16. "Heaven Was Bought for Me" – 4:08
17. "12 Hours of Blues" (Dub) – 5:54

Personnel
Dalek I Love You
Alan Gill
Gordon Hon
Kenny Peers

with backing vocalists Chuca Russo, Heather Balshaw and Amanda Hon (née Hawkins).

Dalek I Love You albums
1983 albums